Amirali Sadeghi (born 9 February 2001) is an Iranian footballer who plays as a midfielder for Esteghlal in the Persian Gulf Pro League.

Club career
Sadeghi made his debut for Saipa in 12th fixture of 2019–20 Persian Gulf Pro League against Machine Sazi while he substituted in for Amir Hossein Hosseinzadeh.

Career statistics

Club

Honours

Esteghlal 
Iran Pro League: 2021–22
Iranian Super Cup: 2022

References

External links
 

2001 births
Living people
Iranian footballers
Association football midfielders
Saipa F.C. players
Esteghlal F.C. players
Iran international footballers